Noenemies is the fourth full-length studio album by alternative hip-hop band Flobots, released May 5, 2017.

Background
In 2015 it was announced that Flobots were working on a new music project called No Enemies, which will focus on issues such as climate change and immigration reform. The band raised funds via Kickstarter to record two albums.

On November 8, 2016, Flobots released a new track, "Rattle the Cage". The song was premiered early than planned in response to the 2016 US Presidential election, with the band saying "Wounds are raw. The pain is real. We wanted to share something a little earlier than planned. This is a song for all of us". On January 20, 2017, they released another new song, the politically charged "Pray", released on the same day as the Inauguration of Donald Trump.

The album was influenced by the works of Vincent Harding, who was a mentor to the band. The group describes the album as "a body of protest songs that speak to the urgency of the current moment."

Track listing

Note

"Voices of the Dead" contains a sample of “Antioch” as performed by the Alabama Sacred Harp Singers.

Personnel
Flobots
Stephen Bracket aka Brer Rabbit - vocals
Jamie Laurie aka Jonny 5 - vocals
Kenny Ortiz - Drums, percussion

Additional musicians
Gabriel Otto - bass, keyboards, synthesizer, guitar, backing vocals, production, arrangements
Mackenzie Gault - viola, backing vocals
Serafin Sanchez - saxophone, keyboards
Tad Lusk- guitar
Tom Hagerman - violin
Evan Orman - cello
Charlie Mertens - upright bass
Eva Holbrook, Maxwell McKee, Suzi Q, Sallie Baker, Chris Barker - Backing vocals
Spirit of Grace (Shamae Matthews, Tonicia London, Christin Grant, C. Larea Edwards) - Backing vocals
Denver Glenarm Singers, Colorado Children's CHorale's 303 Choir - backing vocals
Hugh Ragin, Tom Gershwin - trumpet
Adam Stone - keyboards
Dave Flomberg - trombone
Todd Divel - string and horn recording

Production
Xandy Whitesel - recording, engineering
Jason Livermore - mixing, mastering

Artwork

Josiah Werning - art direction, album art
Dustin Dahlman - album art

Charts

References

2017 albums
Flobots albums